The , also known as the Old Imperial Family (旧皇族), were branches of the Japanese Imperial Family created from branches of the Fushimi-no-miya house, the last surviving Shinnōke cadet branch. All but one (the Nashimoto-no-miya) of these ōke (王家) were formed by the descendants of Prince Fushimi Kuniye.  The ōke were stripped of their membership in the Imperial Family by the American Occupation Authorities in October 1947, as part of the abolition of 11 collateral branches (imperial houses) with 51 members. After that point, only the immediate family of Emperor Shōwa and those of his three brothers retained membership in the Imperial Family. However, unofficial heads of these collateral families still exist for most and are listed herein.

In recent years, conservatives have proposed to reinstate several of the former imperial branches or else to allow the imperial family to adopt male members of the former princely houses, as a solution to the Japanese succession controversy.

List of ōke 
The kyū-miyake were, in order of founding:

 Nashimoto (梨本) - extinct in 1951
 Kuni (久邇) 
 Yamashina (山階) - extinct in 1987
 Kachō (華頂) - extinct in 1924
 Kitashirakawa (北白川) - extinct in 2018
 Higashifushimi or Komatsu (東伏見 / 小松) - extinct in 1922
 Kaya (賀陽)
 Asaka (朝香)
 Higashikuni (東久邇)
 Takeda (竹田)

Unless otherwise stated, all princes listed herein are the sons of their predecessor.

Nashimoto-no-miya 

The Nashimoto-no-miya house was formed by Prince Moriosa, son of Prince Fushimi Sadayoshi (father of Prince Fushimi Kuniye)

Kuni-no-miya 

The Kuni-no-miya house was formed by Prince Asahiko, fourth son of Prince Fushimi Kuniye

Yamashina-no-miya 

The Yamashina-no-miya house was formed by Prince Akira, eldest son of Prince Fushimi Kuniye.

The Yamashina-no-miya became extinct with the death of Yamashina Takehiko.

Kachō-no-miya 

The Kachō-no-miya house was formed by Prince Hirotsune, son of Prince Fushimi Kuniye.

The Kachō-no-miya became extinct with the death of Prince Kachō Hirotada. The line of descent was continued through the kazoku peerage under Kachō Hironobu.

Kitashirakawa-no-miya 

The Kitashirakawa-no-miya house was formed by Prince Satonari, thirteenth son of Prince Fushimi Kuniye.

The Kitashirakawa-no-miya became extinct with the death of Kitashirakawa Michihisa without heirs on 20 October 2018.

Higashifushimi-no-miya / Komatsu-no-miya 

The Higashifushimi-no-miya or the Komatsu-no-miya house was formed by Prince Yoshiaki, seventh son of Prince Fushimi Kuniye.

In 1931, Emperor Shōwa directed his brother-in-law, Prince Kuni Kunihide, to leave Imperial Family status and become Count Higashifushimi Kunihide (hakushaku under the kazoku peerage system), to prevent the Higashifushimi name from extinction. Dowager Princess Higashifushimi Kaneko became a commoner on 14 October 1947. She died in Tokyo in 1955.

Kaya-no-miya 

The Kaya-no-miya house was formed by Prince Kuninori, second son of Prince Kuni Asahiko (first Kuni-no-miya, see above)

Asaka-no-miya 

The Asaka-no-miya house was formed by Prince Yasuhiko, eighth son of Prince Kuni Asahiko.

Higashikuni-no-miya 

The Higashikuni-no-miya house was formed by Prince Naruhiko, ninth son of Prince Kuni Asahiko.

Prince Higashikuni Nobuhiko became simply "Higashikuni Nobuhiko" after the abolition of the Japanese aristocracy during the American occupation of Japan in 1947.

Takeda-no-miya 

The Takeda-no-miya house was formed by Prince Tsunehisa, eldest son of Prince Kitashirakawa Yoshihisa (second Kitashirakawa-no-miya).

Proposal for reinstatement 

In January 2005, Prime Minister Junichiro Koizumi set up a panel consisting of 10 experts from various fields to discuss the succession law and possible ways to ensure stable succession in the imperial family. At that point, no male heir had been born to the Imperial family in 40 years, prompting concerns that there wouldn't be anyone to succeed Crown Prince Naruhito after he became emperor. The panel recommended giving eligibility to females and their descendants, that the first child, regardless of sex, be given priority in ascension, and that female family members who marry commoners be allowed to retain their imperial family member status. Itsuo Sonobe, deputy chairman of the 10-member government panel and a former Supreme Court justice, said that one of the panel's main concerns had been to find a solution that would win the people's support.

Media opinion polls showed an overwhelming majority favoring the change, but the proposed revision was met with fierce opposition from conservatives, who held that the imperial dynasty, which had survived in an unbroken line stretching for nearly 2700 years, could not be dismissed and ended by a wave of deracinated modernity and uncaring recentism. They proposed instead that the government take recourse to ancient traditions under which such situations had been handled in the past. They pointed out that various branches of the old imperial family do still exist in Japan, and that the constitutional definition of the "imperial family" which prevails today was imposed by the occupying western forces as recently as 1947. They maintained that, rather than ending the ancient imperial dynasty, it would be more sensible and less radical to end the recent, western-imposed restrictions. , a member of the former Takeda-no-miya collateral house (nephew of the current family head  and son of Tsunekazu Takeda) and author of a book entitled The Untold Truth of Imperial Family Members, proposed to maintain the male line by restoring the former princely houses or by allowing imperial family members to adopt males from those families. Although Takeda has written that such men should feel a responsibility to maintain the royal house, he said he would find it daunting if asked to play that role himself. According to Takeda, the heads of the former court families agreed in late 2004, just before Koizumi's advisory panel started its discussions, not to speak out on the issue and some of them told him to "not get involved in political issues". Opponents of the reinstatement of former collateral branches, like Liberal Democratic Party politician Yōichi Masuzoe, argued that it would favor members of families with tenuous blood links to long-ago emperors over contemporary female descendants of recent sovereigns.

During a series of hearings on the succession problem in early 2012, Yoshiko Sakurai and Akira Momochi, conservative members of the panel of experts, rejected proposals for female members of the imperial family to be allowed to retain their royal status after marriage and create new branches of the imperial family, and instead suggested revising the Imperial Household Law so that male descendants of former imperial families which renounced their royal status in 1947 be allowed to return to the imperial family as adoptees. Another proposal was to reinstate four of the former imperial families, a solution opposed by the government on the grounds that it would not enjoy public support. Government sources told the Yomiuri Shimbun in May 2012 that the suggestion to reinstate men from the former princely houses as imperial family members through adoption had been unexpected.

In September 2021, it was considered to amend the Imperial Household Law and allow the 85-year old Prince Hitachi to adopt a male member of the collateral branches of the imperial family.

References

Bibliography
 Fujitani, T. Splendid Monarchy: Power and Pageantry in Modern Japan. University of California Press; Reprint edition (1998). 
 Lebra, Sugiyama Takie. Above the Clouds: Status Culture of the Modern Japanese Nobility. University of California Press (1995).

External links 
Japan's "Princess Problem" – Website The Royal Universe

 
Japanese nobility